Barbara Probst (born 1964) is a contemporary artist whose photographic work consists of multiple images of a single scene, shot simultaneously with several cameras via a radio-controlled system. Using a mix of color and black-and-white film, she poses her subjects, positioning each lens at a different angle, and then triggers the cameras’ shutters all at once, creating tableaux of two or more individually framed images. Although the pictures are of the same subject and are taken at the same instant, they provide a range of perspectives. She lives and works in both New York City and Munich. She relocated to New York City in 1997.

Early life and education
Probst was born in Munich. She studied at the Academy of Fine Arts, Munich (Akademie der Bildenden Künste, München) and Kunstakademie Düsseldorf in Germany.

Work
Probst experiments with the temporality and point of view of the shot/counter-shot technique of film by presenting multiple photographs of one scene shot simultaneously with several cameras via a radio-controlled release system. As a result, the subject of the work becomes the photographic moment of exposure itself.

Using a radio-controlled release system, or multiple photographers, she simultaneously triggers the shutters of several cameras pointed at the same scene from various viewpoints. The resulting sequences of images suspend time and stretch out the split second. Artistic Director and Publisher of Camera Austria Reinhard Braun writes of this saying:

Moreover, Probst employs backdrops, often enlarged stills from well-known movies or landscapes. This enhances the sense of artifice by presenting multiple locations within the same moment. Furthermore, equipment such as cameras, studio lights, tripods are visible in the crossfire of images. These including the photographer(s) themselves become subjects of the moment.

Artforum Critic Brian Scholis asserts her work disregards photography's standard concept of “decisive moment,” and instead references cinema's practice of multiple cameras to create movement and diversion in a "Rashomon-like multiplicity of perspectives".

Selected solo exhibitions
2019 Le Bal, Paris, France
2014 Galerie Rudolfinum, Prague, Czechia
2014 Centre PasquArt, Biel, Switzerland
2013 National Museum of Photography, Copenhagen, Denmark
2009 Oldenburger Kunstverein, Oldenburg, Germany
2009 Stills Gallery, Edinburgh, Scotland
2008 Domaine de Kerguehennec, Bignan, France
2008 Madison Museum of Contemporary Art, Madison, WI
2007 Museum of Contemporary Photography, Chicago, IL

Selected group exhibitions
2015 Perfect Likeness: Photography and Composition', Hammer Museum, Los Angeles, CA
2015  Eyes on the Street, Cincinnati Art Museum, Cincinnati, OH
2014 (Mis)Understanding Photography: Works and Manifestos, Museum Folkwang, Essen, Germany
2014 Per Speculum Me Video at Frankfurter Kunstverein, Frankfurt am Main, Germany
2014 Lost Places. Sites of Photography, Hamburger Kunsthalle, Hamburg, Germany
2011 elles@pompidou at the Centre Pompidou, Paris, France
2010 Mixed Use, Manhattan, Photography and Related Practices 1970s to the present, curated by curated by Lynne Cooke and Douglas Crimp, Museo Nacional Centro de Arte Reina Sofía, Madrid Spain
2010 to 2012 Exposed: Voyeurism, Surveillance and the CameraTate Modern, London, UK
San Francisco Museum of Modern Art, San Francisco, CA
Walker Art Center, Minneapolis, MN
2006 New Photography'', Museum of Modern Art, New York, NY

Collections
Centre Pompidou, Paris, France
Folkwang Museum, Essen, Germany
Galleria Nazionale d'Arte Moderna, Rome, Italy
Lenbachhaus, Munich, Germany 
Los Angeles County Museum of Art, Los Angeles, CA
Museo Cantonale d’Arte, Lugano, Switzerland
Museum of Contemporary Art, Chicago, IL
Museum of Contemporary Photography, Chicago, IL 
Museum of Fine Arts, Houston, TX
Museum of Modern Art, New York, NY
National Gallery of Canada, Ottawa, Canada
Pinakothek der Moderne, Munich, Germany
San Francisco Museum of Modern Art, San Francisco, CA 
Vancouver Art Gallery, Vancouver BC, Canada
Whitney Museum of American Art, New York, NY

Editorial work and fashion campaigns
2019 Vogue Italia editorial, January
2018 Wallpaper, July
2018 Modern Matter, Autumn/Winter
2018 Garage Magazine, September
2017 Marni, Spring/Summer
2017 Vogue Italia, July

Selected monographs
2019 The Moment in Space, published by Le Bal, Paris and Hartmann Projects, with an essay by Frederic Paul
2017 12 Moments, published by Editions Xavier Barral, with an essay by Robert Hobbs
2016 12 Moments, published by Hartmann Projects, with an essay by Robert Hobbs
2013 Barbara Probst, published by Hatje Cantz, Germany, with texts by Felicity Lunn, Jens Erdman Rasmussen, and Lynne Tillman, and an interview with the artist by Frédéric Paul
2008 Barbara Probst – Exposures, published by Steidl, Germany and the Museum of Contemporary Photography, Chicago, with an introduction by Karen Irvine, an interview with Johannes Meinhardt and an essay by David Bate 
2002 Barbara Probst, published for exhibition at Cuxhavener Kunstverein, Cuxhaven, Germany, with an essay by Stefan Schessl
1998 Welcome, published for exhibition at Frankfurter Kunstverein, Munich, Germany, with an essay by Thomas Dreher
1998 Through The Looking Glass, published for exhibition at Anhaltische Gemäldegalerie Dessau, Dessau, Germany, with an essay by Thomas Dreher
1998 Barbara Probst, published for exhibition at Akademiegalerie, Munich Germany, with a short essay by Michael Hofstetter
1998 InExpectation, published for exhibition at Binder & Rid Gallery, Munich, Germany, with an essay by Thomas Dreher
1994 Barbara Probst, My Museum, published by Kulturreferat München, Munich, Germany

External links
Barbara Probst
Barbara Probst Instagram Profile

References

1964 births
Living people
Photographers from Munich
German women photographers
German contemporary artists
21st-century women photographers
21st-century German women artists
German emigrants to the United States